Chambré Brabazon Ponsonby-Barker (12 June 1762 – 13 December 1834) was an Irish Member of Parliament.

He was born Chambré Brabazon Ponsonby, son of Chambré Brabazon Ponsonby by his wife Mary, daughter of Sir William Barker, 3rd Baronet. He adopted the surname of Barker on inheriting Kilcooly Abbey from his uncle Sir William Barker, 4th Baronet in 1818.

Ponsonby-Barker represented Dungarvan in the Irish House of Commons from 1790 to 1798.

He was married on 4 June 1791 to Lady Henrietta Taylour, daughter of Thomas Taylour, 1st Earl of Bective. They had three sons and a daughter, Catherine Jane, who married Edward Michael Conolly.

References
 http://thepeerage.com/p3194.htm#i31936
 https://web.archive.org/web/20090601105535/http://www.leighrayment.com/commons/irelandcommons.htm

1762 births
1834 deaths
Irish MPs 1790–1797
Members of the Parliament of Ireland (pre-1801) for County Waterford constituencies